William Arthur Beeton, Jr. (August 15, 1943 – November 2, 2002) was an American attorney and Republican politician. In 1981, he was elected alongside Charles R. Hawkins and Kenneth E. Calvert to the Virginia House of Delegates, but a three-judge panel of the United States District Court for the Eastern District of Virginia found the state's multi-member districts to violated the equal protection clause and ordered that new elections take place the following year. Beeton was defeated in the 1982 22nd district Republican primary by Joseph P. Crouch. He moved to northern Virginia, practiced law, and served as chairman of the board of directors of Wakefield Country Day School. In 2002, he died while on a business trip in Rio de Janeiro.

References

External links
 
 

1943 births
2002 deaths
Republican Party members of the Virginia House of Delegates
University of Lynchburg alumni
University of Richmond School of Law alumni
People from Lexington, Virginia
20th-century American politicians